Chiplun railway station is a train station on Konkan Railways. It is located just off NH 66 in the Konkan town of Chiplun. The preceding station on the line is Anjani railway station and the next station is Kamathe railway station.

Trains
10103/10104 Mandovi Express
10111/10112 Konkan Kanya Express
11003/11004 Tutari Express
11085/11086 Lokmanya Tilak Terminus–Madgaon AC Double Decker Express
11099/11100 Lokmanya Tilak Terminus–Madgaon AC Double Decker Express
12051/12052 Dadar–Madgaon Jan Shatabdi Express
12483/12484 Kochuveli–Amritsar Weekly Express
12617/12618 Mangala Lakshadweep Express
12619/12620 Matsyagandha Express
12741/12742 Vasco da Gama–Patna Superfast Express
16335/16336 Gandhidham–Nagercoil Express
16345/16346 Netravati Express
19259/19260 Kochuveli–Bhavnagar Express
19331/19332 Kochuveli–Indore Weekly Express
22113/22114 Lokmanya Tilak Terminus–Kochuveli Express
22115/22116 Lokmanya Tilak Terminus–Karmali AC Superfast Express
22119/22120 Mumbai CSMT–Karmali Tejas Express
22149/22150 Pune–Ernakulam Express
22475/22476 Hisar–Coimbatore AC Superfast Express
22629/22630 Dadar–Tirunelveli Express
22633/22634 Thiruvananthapuram–Hazrat Nizamuddin Express
50103/50104 Dadar Central–Ratnagiri Passenger
50105/50106 Sindhudurg Passenger

References

Railway stations along Konkan Railway line
Railway stations in Ratnagiri district
Ratnagiri railway division